Grape Valley is an area of arid land in Turpan, Xinjiang, China, where grapes and other fruits are grown. The valley is 8 km long, 600-2,000 meters wide, and is located some 10 km east of Turpan's city center.

Turpan has a historically long tradition of growing grape and other fruits, using the karez underground irrigation system. It is famous for growing the seedless white grape, the manaizi (mares nipple) grape. Raisins and other dried fruits are also sold at the Grape Valley tourists' area.

Grape and raisin production in Turpan accounts for over eighty percent of China's total, making China the world's third-largest producer of raisins and the world's largest producer of green raisins.

See also
 Turpan Depression
 Chunche - used for drying grapes

References

External links
Karez Wells - UNESCO World Heritage Commission

Turpan